Hypatima ovata is a moth in the family Gelechiidae. It was described by Kyu-Tek Park and Margarita Gennadievna Ponomarenko in 1999. It is found in Thailand.

The length of the forewings is about 14 mm. The forewings are pale greyish orange, covered with brown scales throughout. The median costal patch is elongated and trapezoidal, separated by a greyish-orange stripe basally and accompanied by a small, dark patch bordered with a greyish-orange stripe. The hindwings are grey.

Etymologly
The species name refers to the egg-shaped eighth tergite of the abdomen and is derived from Latin ovatus.

References

Hypatima
Moths described in 1999